The Women's individual recurve archery discipline at the 2012 Summer Paralympics was contested in two classifications, one combined of W1/W2 wheelchair competitors and one for standing archers. The competitions ran from August 30 to September 4.

In the ranking rounds each archer shot 72 arrows. In the knock-out stages each archer shot three arrows per set, scoring two points for a won set and one for a draw. Matches were won by the first archer to six points.

W1/W2

In the ranking round each archer shot 72 arrows. In the knock-out stages each archer shot three arrows per set, scoring two points for a won set and one for a draw. Matches were won by the first archer to six points.

Ranking Round
PR = Paralympic Record. DT=Disk toss used to break the tie.

Competition bracket

Section 1

Section 2

Section 3

Section 4

Finals

Standing

Ranking Round

Competition bracket

Section 1

Section 2

Section 3

Section 4

Finals

References

W
2012 in women's archery